Minino is a rural locality (a village) in Vereshchaginsky District, Perm Krai, Russia. The population was 19 as of 2010.

Geography 
Minino is located 30 km west of Vereshchagino (the district's administrative centre) by road. Lukino is the nearest rural locality.

References 

Rural localities in Vereshchaginsky District